Harumi Fujita (also known as Harumi Fujita Kawabe) is a Japanese researcher of Mexican archaeology, who has specialized in pre-classical period of the northern states of Baja California and Baja California Sur. Her research has shown that fishing cultures had arisen in the area at the end of the Pleistocene period, indicating an occupation from at least 11,000 years ago. In a cave shelf known as the Babisuri Shelter, radiocarbon dating indicated the area may have been occupied 40,000 years ago.

Early life
Harumi Fujita was born in 1954 in Otaru, Hokkaido, Japan and was raised in Sapporo until her fifth birthday. Because her father was a student at the University of Michigan, the family, which included a brother and her parents, moved to Ann Arbor, Michigan for two years, where Fujita began her primary schooling. Returning to Japan, she completed her secondary studies and attended Hokkaido University. After her graduation, Fujita moved to Israel to study Hebrew and met several Mexican students in her classes. Living on a kibbutz, she became interested in archaeology, visiting various sites during her two years in the country. In 1978, she moved to Mexico City and enrolled in archaeology classes at the Escuela Nacional de Antropologia e Historia (ENAH). Completing her course work in 1982, she accompanied Jesus Mora and Baudelina Garcia Uranga to the Baja California Peninsula in northern Mexico to complete her field projects. Writing her thesis on the shellfish gathered by the prehistoric indigenous people on the peninsula, she graduated with a bachelor's degree in archaeology in 1985.

Career
Working on a waste pile in Baja California Sur, Fujita postulated in 1988, that the settlements along the coast from the remains of sea animals appeared to be transitory.
In 1991, Fujita was designated as a researcher with the Instituto Nacional de Antropología e Historia (INAH) (National Institute of Anthropology and History) and assigned to Baja California Sur working the cape region. Her initial task was to coordinate a survey of the area and document sites. Between 1994 and 1996, Fujita's survey of the Island as well as nearby Isla Partida were compiled as El poblamiento de América visto desde la isla Espíritu Santo (The settlement of America seen from the island Espiritu Santo) and documented 127 coastal sites, which included caves, open-air campsites, shelters, and waste piles, containing artifacts, burials and cave paintings. Dated to indicate habitation between 10,000 and 21,000 years ago, the findings confirmed occupation of the island long before the arrival of Europeans.

In 1996, Fujita identified the Babisuri Shelter site on the Island of Espíritu Santo. In stratum III of the shelter, she discovered artifacts made from shell that were radiocarbon dated to yield dates indicating occupation of the site at 40,000 years ago. The findings were significant, as they indicated that habitation of the Americas may have occurred thousands of years before previously estimated. Eighty-eight different dating tests were performed on the site, confirming five layers of soils and three different occupations by inhabitants for the Archaic period. In 2000, Fujita and Judith F. Porcasi evaluated methods in which early hunters might have exploited dolphins. Lack of remains, has caused many theorists to reject that such hunting occurred in northern Mexico, but Fujita and Porcasi postulated that clacking stones together underwater from the side of a boat, could disrupt the sonar of dolphins. In areas where deep water is found near the shoreline, the technique could be used to beach the animals and allow them to be clubbed or speared, as it was in the North Atlantic and the Pacific Islands.

Fujita discovered artifacts in 2011, which were c-shaped hooks, similar to those found in Ecuador, Australia and along the coast of the Arabian Sea, indicating that as early as 8,000 to 11,000 years ago, indigenous peoples living in Baja California Sur were engaged in fishing. Fourteen of the hooks were definitively dated to the Terminal Pleistocene era, making the among the oldest fishing hooks known to exist and confirming that fishing cultures had emerged in North America before the Early Holocene period. In 2013, Aníbal Lopez Espinoza published an analysis of the cave paintings documented by Fujita, Dave Huddart and Silva. Expanding her research area along the coast covering the area between La Paz and the Sierra de las Cacachilas (west to east) and between El Novillo and Tecolote Beach (south to north), Fujita identified 172 sites with significant archaeological remains. In all, her work in Baja California Sur has identified over 500 places with traces of historical value. In 2014, she located two caves near Tecolote Beach which confirm ancient settlement of the area to around 10,000 years ago in the Early Holocene period. Similarly to earlier sites found on Espíritu Santo, marine resources and shells were frequently used by the inhabitants. Continuing her work on the site, she discovered 61 burial sites, which show funerary characteristics of dual burials for the ancient inhabitants.

Selected works

References

Citations

Bibliography

 

20th-century archaeologists
21st-century archaeologists
Date of birth missing (living people)
Living people
Japanese archaeologists
People from Otaru
Hokkaido University alumni
National School of Anthropology and History alumni
Japanese women archaeologists
21st-century Japanese women writers
20th-century Japanese women writers
1954 births